Hafiz Khel is a sub-tribe of Gandapur tribe. About 80–85% are now migrated to Dera Ismail Khan and Tank Districts of Khyber Pakhtunkhwa Province and Zhob province of Baluchistan.

Language
They are bilingual. Members living in Zhob and Tank speak Pashto. However, those Living in Dera Ismail Khan and Kulachi have not retained their ancestral language and mostly speak the Derawali form of Saraiki dialect which is influenced by Pashto and Seraiki. Like other Pashtun tribes, they generally observe a pre-Islamic honor code formally known as Pashtunwali. 

Gandapur Pashtun tribes
Pashtun tribes
Pashto-language surnames
Pakistani names